Michaela Pochabová (born 17 October 1989) is a former professional Slovak tennis player. 

On 7 June 2010, she reached her highest WTA singles ranking of No. 236 whilst her best doubles ranking is No. 265, achieved on 14 June 2010.

ITF finals

Singles: 7 (3–4)

Doubles: 10 (5–5)

References

External links
 
 

1989 births
Living people
Slovak female tennis players
21st-century Slovak women